Acanthopelma beccarii is a species of spider belonging to the family Theraphosidae (tarantulas). It is endemic to Guyana in northern South America.

While there are specimens held in captivity, it is not a very popular species in this regard.

References
  (2008): The world spider catalog, version 8.5. American Museum of Natural History.

Further reading
 (1947): "Diagnosi preliminari de specie nuove di aracnidi della Guiana Britannica raccolte dai professori Beccari e Romiti". Monitore Zoologico Italiano 56: 20-34.

Theraphosidae
Spiders of South America
Spiders described in 1947